Ahmeti is a surname. Notable people with the surname include:

 Ali Ahmeti (born 1959), Albanian politician
 Mimoza Ahmeti (born 1963), Albanian poet
 Shpend Ahmeti (born 1978), Kosovar politician
 Vilson Ahmeti (born 1951), Albanian politician

Albanian-language surnames
Patronymic surnames
Surnames from given names